The Ninth Wave  is an 1850 painting by Russian marine painter Ivan Aivazovsky.

Ninth Wave may also refer to:

Music
 "The Ninth Wave", the second side of the 1985 album Hounds of Love by British singer Kate Bush
 "The Ninth Wave", a song by American heavy metal band Manilla Road from the 1985 album Open the Gates
 "The Ninth Wave", a song by Italian progressive death metal band Sadist from the 1996 album  Tribe
 "The Ninth Wave", a song by German power metal band Blind Guardian from the 2015 album Beyond the Red Mirror
 "The Ninth Wave", a 2017 song by German alternative metal band Emil Bulls
 The Ninth Wave, a pop punk band from Glasgow that won a 2016 Scottish Alternative Music Awards

Other uses
 Part of a theory of the evolution of consciousness by the New age Mayanist author Carl Johan Calleman
 A variant of the notion of sneaker wave
 The Ninth Wave, 1956 book by American political scientist Eugene Burdick
 The Ninth Wave, a 1899 play by Sophia Smirnova

See also
 The Massive: Ninth Wave, a prequel to the comics series The Massive